Tom Johnston (June 19, 1881 – September 11, 1969) was an English-born farmer and political figure in Saskatchewan, Canada. He represented Touchwood in the Legislative Assembly of Saskatchewan from 1938 to 1956 as a member of the Co-operative Commonwealth Federation.

He was born in Birmingham and came to Manitoba in 1901, moving to Saskatchewan two years later. Johnston operated a farm near Cymric. He ran unsuccessfully for a seat in the provincial assembly in 1934 as a member of the Farmer-Labour Group (the CCF's predecessor) and was defeated in the federal riding of Prince Albert district in 1935.  Johnston served as Speaker of the Legislative Assembly of Saskatchewan from 1944 to 1956. He died in Regina at the age of 88.

References 
 

Saskatchewan Co-operative Commonwealth Federation MLAs
20th-century Canadian politicians
Speakers of the Legislative Assembly of Saskatchewan
1881 births
1969 deaths
British emigrants to Canada